National Secondary Route 226, or just Route 226 (or ) is a National Road Route of Costa Rica, located in the San José, Cartago provinces.

Description
In San José province the route covers Desamparados canton (San Cristóbal district), Tarrazú canton (San Marcos district), Dota canton (Santa María, Jardín districts), León Cortés Castro canton (San Pablo, San Andrés, Santa Cruz, San Antonio districts).

In Cartago province the route covers El Guarco canton (San Isidro district).

References

Highways in Costa Rica